Samooo or SAMOO may refer to:

Samoo Architects & Engineers
Samoo, South Khorasan, a village in South Khorasan Province, Iran